Lee Jae-sung (born 5 July 1988) is a South Korean football defender who plays for Chungnam Asan FC.

In January 2019, he moved to Incheon United.

Honours
Ulsan Hyundai
 AFC Champions League (1): 2012

References

External links 

1988 births
Living people
Association football defenders
South Korean footballers
Suwon Samsung Bluewings players
Ulsan Hyundai FC players
Gimcheon Sangmu FC players
Jeonbuk Hyundai Motors players
Incheon United FC players
Lee Jae-sung
K League 1 players
K League 2 players
South Korea international footballers